Sybra lingafelteri is a species of beetle in the family Cerambycidae. It was described by Skale and Weigel in 2012.

References

lingafelteri
Beetles described in 2012